not to be confused with the Allen Correctional Center, Kinder, Louisiana

The Allen-Oakwood Correctional Institution (AOCI), also known as the Allen Correctional Institution, is a prison located in Lima, Ohio, a facility of the Ohio Department of Rehabilitation and Correction.

History 

Hope Taft, wife of Bob Taft who was the Governor of Ohio from 1999 to 2007, approached the administration at Pickaway Correctional Institution in 2000 regarding the establishment of a reading room for children who visit the prison. The idea spread statewide and the room has been built in all 32 institutions that comprise the Department of Rehabilitation and Correction including the Allen-Oakwood Correctional Institution. Each room has an inmate narrator who reads to visiting children twice a day.

2014 prison escape 
On the evening of September 11, 2014, 19-year-old T.J. Lane, the perpetrator of the Chardon High School shooting, escaped from the prison along with two other inmates. Lane had been a difficult inmate, being disciplined seven times during the 18 months he spent in prison since being sentenced to three life sentences for the shooting deaths of his victims. Escapee Lindsey Bruce was quickly recaptured, and soon after, Lane was also taken back into custody. The third fugitive, Clifford E. Opperud, 45, who was serving time for aggravated robbery, burglary, and kidnapping was the last to be recaptured, being found in the early morning hours of September 12.

The prison 
The population of the facility is 1,498 male inmates, most of whom are housed under minimum or medium security. A few prisoners are held under close or maximum security. All Maximum Security inmates are held at the Oakwood compound. The facility employs roughly 439 staff members of which 284 are classified as security. The cost of maintaining each inmate at the facility is approximately $62 per day.

In addition, special classes are offered in power equipment technology, turf management, carpentry, masonry and plumbing.

Special programs 
Bonds Beyond Bars is a program that allows fathers housed at Allen-Oakwood Correctional Institution to participate in girl scout activities with their daughters in the visiting room on a biweekly basis.

My Child and I is a program that educates inmates on issues regarding family responsibility, relationship building and behavior cycles to promote positive fatherhood.

Angels for Animals is an organization that brings abandoned kittens to Allen-Oakwood Correctional Institution where selected inmates care for the animals 24 hours a day until a home can be found for them. As of 2007, 40 kittens had been brought to the prison.

The Sugar Creek Development Unit (SCDU) is a 60-bed residential facility on the prison grounds that provides psychiatric and psycho-social services for mentally ill inmates. For some, this program is only temporary during their incarceration while for others, the SCDU serves as their living quarters for the duration of their sentence.

The Residential Treatment Unit (RTU) is a special facility that also provides psychiatric assistance for inmates who have difficulty living in the general prison population and are admitted to this program not only from within the Allen-Oakwood Correctional Institution but from other correctional institutions in Ohio as well.

Healing Through Music and Drumming up Hope are two programs that the Lima Symphony Orchestra brings to the Allen-Oakwood Correctional Institution. Through these programs symphony musicians present concerts and facilitate drum circles with inmates.

Notable inmates 
James Ruppert
Donald Harvey
T.J. Lane
Nathaniel Cook

References

External links
Allen-Oakwood Correctional Institution at the Ohio Department of Rehabilitation and Correction

Prisons in Ohio
Government buildings completed in 1987
Buildings and structures in Lima, Ohio
1987 establishments in Ohio